Kaatteri (and also spelled Katteri) is an 2022 Indian Tamil-language comedy horror film written and directed by Deekay. The film stars Vaibhav, Sonam Bajwa, Varalaxmi Sarathkumar  and Aathmika. The film has no songs and score is composed by S. N. Prasad. It is produced by K. E. Gnanavel Raja under his production banner of Studio Green. The film was released theatrically on 5 August 2022, and was a box-office bomb.

Plot 
The film begins with a 1968 local village festival. One person cuts an electric post, another person comes and pushes down the post, and the electric wire rips all of the village people. And then the film is set in 2019. Gajja, Kaliyurunda, and Sankar, a group of kidnappers, kidnap Kamini and bring her to Naina. Naina orders his henchmen to kill the kidnappers so they can't tell anyone about it. The kidnappers escape from the henchmen and come to Kiran's first night room and tell them about the kidnap and Naina's plan to ask for a huge ransom from Kamini's family. Shwetha instructs them to kidnap Kamini from the henchmen and demand a large ransom. As per her instruction, Kiran and his friends kidnap Kamini and ask her about Maanga Mani. Kamini tells them about him. He was taking a treatment from her, and a few weeks ago, he said he was about to go on a treasure hunt for gold. Shwetha finds Maanga Mani's location by entering his number on Truecaller. They went to the same location that was shown on Truecaller. The village's name is Kolaatipuram. When they enter the village, the behavior of the villagers is weird, and they realize that the villagers are ghosts. They are the people who died in 1968. After knowing that the villagers are ghosts, they try to elope from the village, but they can't escape from the village. Wherever they run, they end up in the festival area. And Kamini tells them that Sankar was taken by a ghost, Mathamma, who asked her, "Am I beautiful?" Shwetha instructs them to meet Maathamma and correctly answer questions in order to obtain the gold. So they walked to the place of Mathamma. Shwetha ran away after seeing Mathamma, and Kiran and his friends got beaten by Mathamma. Mathamma tells her story, which happened in 1968. She, her sister Mohini, and her uncle Venu were living in the same house. Venu tells Sambath to dig a well at the back of their house and orders Mohini to help him. While digging the well, the land slides and the well becomes too deep. Sambath gets out of the well with the help of Mohini and Mathamma. He requests that they bring a lamp to measure the depth of the well. They tied a rope around the lamp and put the lamp into the well. When they pulled up the rope, the lamp was missing, but a mud pot was tied with the rope. When they opened the mud pot, the pot was filled with gold jewels. By seeing this, Sambath tells them he is going to buy more lamps to get more gold. After Sambath leaves, they discover a piece of paper with the words, "If you have anything else, send it to me." So they took a chicken and threw it down the well, and this time they got a large mud pot filled with gold and a piece of paper that said, "If you have anything else, send it to me." Sambath came back with a lot of lamps, and he put all of those lamps into the well, but when he pulled the rope, all of those lamps were damaged. When he saw those damaged lamps, he got angry and took an aruval and entered the well tied up with a rope. When Mathamma and Mohini pulled the rope, a big wooden barrel appeared with a paper written with "Keep sending this to me". By seeing the paper, they send their drunkard uncle Venu into the well. They understood that the well needed human flesh. So they ask Aarumugam, a police officer, for dead bodies. He also gave them some dead bodies. One night, he enters the house of Mathamma and sees a lot of gold. At that time, Kaatteri came out of the well and ate one of the policemen and wrote on the wall, "Do not starve the well." By knowing this, he planned to kill all of the villagers and feed the Kaatteri. During the festival, he cuts the electric post and the wire rips the people. They put all of the dead bodies into the well. He also pushed Mohini and Mathamma into the well. Mathamma's story ends, and she asks Kiran, "Tell me now, which part of my story was a fact and which was fiction." Suddenly, Kamini behaves abnormally, and her face changes to Mohini's. Ponnambalam comes to the house and asks Kiran to burn Kamini. Kiran burns her, and Ponnambalam captures the ghost of Mohini. When Kaatteri comes to kill them, they try to manage and save their lives. By luck, they managed that night, and then Ponnambalam tried to kill Kiran while running after him. He fell down and shot himself in the chest and died. Kiran took the bottle that has Mohini's ghost in it and gave it to Naina. Naina opens it, and he gets frightened by seeing the ghost. In bed, Kiran asks Shwetha about how she knows that Aarumugam is Naina, and Shwetha asks Kiran 'am I beautiful '?

Cast

Production 
The principal photography of the film commenced around 20 April 2018, after the launch of the film in Chennai. The film initially speculated to cast four heroines in the female lead role including Oviya, but Oviya was later replaced by Aathmika in the shoot. However, the filmmakers managed to rope in Varalaxmi Sarathkumar, Sonam Bajwa, Aathmika and Manali Rathod in the female prominent roles. Telugu actor Aadi was initially selected as lead actor however he later opted out and was replaced by Vaibhav. It was revealed that most of the portions of the film were set in a jungle in Chennai and abroad, including the neighbourhood country Sri Lanka while most of the scenes of the film were apparent to have been shot during night time. The shooting of the film wrapped up in June 2018.

Music
Soundtrack was composed by S. N. Prasad collaborating with director Deekay for second time after Yaamirukka Bayamey (2014). A single track titled "En Peru Enna Kelu" was released in June 2020.
En Per Enna - Jonita Gandhi, Maria Roe Vincent

Release
The film was released theatrically on 5 August 2022.

Home media
The post-theatrical streaming rights of the film was bought by Netflix and the satellite rights of the film was bought by Zee Tamil.

References

External links 

 

2020s Tamil-language films
2022 films
Indian comedy horror films
Films shot in Sri Lanka
Films shot in Chennai
Films set in jungles
2022 comedy horror films